The Mother Lode Musical Theatre was a performing group in Marin County from the 1970s to 2020. It also provided classes to schools and groups. It was most noted for its Drake Pageant and major productions such as Voices of Califia and Gambling Jones.

Principals
Key participants were Corinne Swall, soprano and Monroe Kanouse, composer.

Productions
 Angel Island Jubilee, 1998
 Angel Island Fiesta de Merienda, 1996, 1997
 Bustles & Blooms, 1993
 California Gold Rush, 2004
 California Gold Rush Songbook
 Los Californios, 1992, 1993, 1995
 Coyote & the Human People, an opera for young people, book & libretto, 2000
 Coyote's Tail, book & libretto
 The Courtship of Francisca & Mariano Vallejo, 1997
 Creation of the Earth as Told by Coyote
 Divas of the Golden West, 1976 initial production
 Drake Pageant, Point Reyes, California
 Fiesta Sonoma, 1993
 Gambling Jones, a Gold Rush Gilbert & Sullivan, Sausalito 1987, Orange Coast College, Clark County, Berkeley Performing Arts Coliseum, Palm Desert, 1991.
 Gold Rush Gaeties, A Musical Variety Show, 1988
 Gold Rush Show, Valecito School 1997
 Ho! California
 I Come to Californay-aye, Califonrnia's Gold Rush cultural history taught through song and dance
 Nightengale of the Gold Rush
 Las Navidades, 1992
 Los Posada, Point Reyes Station 2000 & 2003
 School Days, a day in the Dixie Schoolhouse in 1870, 2001
 The Race to California
 Tule Reed Boat Workbook
 Voices of Califia, Chico 1991, Marin 1989

Workshops
Singers Diction
Vocal Caching
Method Acting
Stage Deportment
Character Acting

References

Musical theatre companies
Organizations based in Marin County, California